The Marathon County Fairgrounds are located in Wausau, Wisconsin. In 1980, the site was added to the National Register of Historic Places.

History
The county fair, now known as the Wisconsin Valley Fair, has been held at the site since 1868. It features a stock judging pavilion (pictured) that was designed by Alexander C. Eschweiler and built in 1921. Other features on the site include a carousel, a kids' train, a curling club and campgrounds.

References

Fairgrounds in the United States
Geography of Marathon County, Wisconsin
National Register of Historic Places in Marathon County, Wisconsin
Event venues on the National Register of Historic Places in Wisconsin